Vanessa de Sousa Fernandes  (born 14 September 1985) is a Portuguese athlete who is a former triathlon European and world champion, and an Olympic medalist. In duathlon, she was also European and world champion.

Fernandes won the European Triathlon Championships five consecutive years (5 elite and 3 under-23 titles), beginning in 2004, and on 1 September 2007, she became world champion for the first time, in Hamburg, Germany, managing to grab the only title (apart from the Olympic sceptre) missing from her career. She competes for S.L. Benfica since 2005.

Career
Born in Perosinho, Vila Nova de Gaia, Fernandes was introduced to triathlon in 1999, when she was fourteen, by her father, Venceslau Fernandes, a former professional cyclist and winner of the 1984 Volta a Portugal. She competed for her local triathlon club Clube de Perosinho and then for Belenenses where she became world champion of under-23. Later in 2005, Fernandes joined S.L. Benfica and represents the club to this day. Occasionally, she enters cross country events. She competed at the Olympic Games for the first time in 2004. On the second Olympic triathlon competition, at age eighteen, she finished in eighth place with a total time of 2:06:15.39.

In June 2006, Fernandes won the International Triathlon Union World Cup, ranking number one in the world. In September, she equaled Australian Emma Carney's record number of consecutive wins in the World Cup, with a twelfth victory at the Beijing leg. Later that year, she was awarded with the "Best Female Athlete of the Year" prize from CNID (Clube Nacional de Imprensa Desportiva) at its annual sports gala. In 2008, she won her 5th-in-a-row Elite European Championships title, at "home", in Lisbon, Portugal.

In August 2008, she finished second in the Beijing Olympic Games, winning her first olympic medal.

After years without competing, Fernandes is training with the 2016 Summer Olympics in mind.

Achievements
2001
18th – European Championships (Carlsbad, Czech Republic) – junior
2nd – European Duathlon Championships (Mafra, Portugal) – junior (team)

2002
World Cup:
34th (Tiszaújváros, Hungary)
29th (Nice, France)
12th (Funchal, Portugal)
4th – World Championships (Cancún, Mexico) – junior
3rd – European Championships (Győr, Hungary) – junior
3rd – European Duathlon Championships (Zeitz, Germany) – junior

2003
World Cup:
10th (Ishigaki, Japan)
9th (St. Anthonys, United States)
1st (Madrid, Spain)
9th (Funchal, Portugal)
1st (Cancún, Mexico)
3rd (Rio de Janeiro, Brazil)
1st – Estoril International Triathlon (Estoril, Portugal)
2nd – Praia da Vitória International Triathlon (Praia da Vitória, Portugal)
5th – World Summer Games (Santos, Brazil)
European Championships (Carlsbad, Czech Republic):
1st – junior
2nd – junior (team)
3rd – World Championships (Queenstown, New Zealand) – junior
1st – World Duathlon Championships (Affoltern, Switzerland) – junior

2004 
1st – Portugal National Championships
World Cup:
1st (Madrid, Spain)
1st (Rio de Janeiro, Brazil)
5th – World Championships (Funchal, Portugal)
8th – Olympic Games (Athens, Greece)
1st – European Under-23 Championships (Tiszaújváros, Hungary)
1st – European Championships (Valencia, Spain)

2005 
1st – European Under-23 Championships (Sofia, Bulgaria)
1st – European Championships (Lausanne, Switzerland)
4th – World Championships (Gamagori, Japan)
World Cup: 
1st (Madrid, Spain)
1st (Mazatlán, Mexico)
1st (Beijing, China)
1st (New Plymouth, New Zealand)

2006
World Cup:
1st (Aqaba, Jordan)
1st (Mazatlán, Mexico)
1st (Madrid, Spain)
1st (Corner Brook, Canada)
1st (Hamburg, Germany)
1st (Beijing, China) 
3rd – Portugal Cross-Country Championships (Guimarães)
1st – Portugal Triathlon Cup (Quarteira)
1st – European Cup (Estoril, Portugal)
1st – European Championships (Autun, France)
1st – European Under-23 Championships (Rijeka, Croatia)
5th – Life Time Fitness Triathlon (Minneapolis, United States)
2nd – World Championships (Lausanne, Switzerland)
1st – European Duathlon Championships (Rimini, Italy)
6th – Corrida do Tejo (Lisbon, Portugal)

2007
World Cup:
3rd (Mooloolaba, Australia)
1st (Ishigaki, Japan)
1st (Lisbon, Portugal)
1st (Madrid, Spain)
1st (Salford, United Kingdom)
1st (Beijing, China)
1st (Rhodes, Greece)
1st – World Duathlon Championships (Győr, Hungary)
1st – European Championships (Copenhagen, Denmark)
1st - World Championships (Hamburg, Germany)
1st – Life Time Fitness Triathlon (Minneapolis, United States)

2008

Olympic Games (Beijing, China):
2nd
World Cup:
2nd (Mooloolaba, Australia)
1st (Madrid, Spain)
1st – European Championships (Lisbon, Portugal)
10th – World Championships (Vancouver, British Columbia, Canada)

Orders
 Grand Officer of the Order of Prince Henry
 Commander of the Order of Merit
 Officer of the Order of Merit

References

External links
 International Triathlon Union (ITU) profile

1985 births
Living people
Sportspeople from Vila Nova de Gaia
Portuguese female athletes
Portuguese female triathletes
Olympic triathletes of Portugal
Triathletes at the 2004 Summer Olympics
Triathletes at the 2008 Summer Olympics
Olympic silver medalists for Portugal
Duathletes
Golden Globes (Portugal) winners
Olympic medalists in triathlon
Medalists at the 2008 Summer Olympics
S.L. Benfica (triathlon)